Willian Rainey Marshall (October 17, 1825January 8, 1896) was an American politician. He was the fifth Governor of Minnesota from January 8, 1866 to January 9, 1870 and was a member of the Republican party. He served as an officer in the 7th Minnesota Volunteer Infantry Regiment during the American Civil War (1861–1865).

He was born in Columbia, Missouri. Marshall first settled in Illinois and Wisconsin, where he mined for lead and surveyed land. He was elected to serve in the Wisconsin State Assembly in the 1st Wisconsin Legislature in 1848 as a Democrat, but his seat was successfully contested by Joseph Bowron, because his home in St. Croix Falls was on the west (Minnesota Territory) side of the new state line. In 1849 he crossed the St. Croix River to settle in St. Paul, soon home of his fledgling hardware business. He served a term in the first Minnesota territorial legislature, and his reputation grew when he served as chairman of the convention that founded the state's Republican Party.

The one-time banker, dairy farmer, stock-raiser, and newspaper publisher volunteered to fight in both the Civil War and the Dakota War of 1862. He enlisted as a private in the 8th Minnesota and was quickly appointed lieutenant colonel of the 7th Minnesota on August 28, 1862. He fought in many of the battles of the Dakota War being promoted to colonel of his regiment on November 6, 1863. Marshall and his regiment were transferred to Andrew Jackson Smith's command in Missouri and took part in the pursuit of Sterling Price. Smith's command was attached to George H. Thomas' army outside Nashville. When Colonel Sylvester G. Hill was killed the first day of the battle of Nashville, Colonel Marshall took command of Hill's brigade and led it throughout the rest of the battle. He continued in brigade command when transferred to Mobile, Alabama to take part in the Battle of Fort Blakeley. Colonel Marshall was brevetted brigadier general of volunteers, dated March 13, 1865.

Marshall won the 1865 and 1867 gubernatorial elections. As governor, he repeatedly urged passage of a black suffrage amendment. After defeating it twice, the legislature finally adopted the amendment and inspired Marshall to declare that the "free young state of Minnesota" is "now altogether free." During William Marshall's administration, his adoptive state experienced a post-Civil-War surge of growth and development: its population doubled to 350,000, its railroad mileage quadrupled, and its commercial endeavors flourished.

After leaving office, Marshall remained active in both the private and public sectors as an attorney, banker, and as a railroad and land commissioner. He was a partner in a law firm with Jude Kerr and Robertson Howard while residing in St. Paul, but subsequent commercial ventures faltered, as did his health. He moved to California in 1894 and died there two years later, in Pasadena on January 8, 1896. He was buried at Oakland Cemetery in Saint Paul. He is listed as one of the few politicians to be an adherent of Swedenborgianism.

In Minnesota, Marshall County and the city of Marshall were both named after him.

Notes

References

External links
Biographical information and his  gubernatorial records are available for research use at the Minnesota Historical Society.
Minnesota Legislators Past & Present

  	

1825 births
1896 deaths
Farmers from Minnesota
Members of the Minnesota Territorial Legislature
Members of the Wisconsin State Assembly
Governors of Minnesota
Minnesota Republicans
American Swedenborgians
Politicians from Columbia, Missouri
People of Minnesota in the American Civil War
Republican Party governors of Minnesota
Union Army colonels
Wisconsin Democrats
19th-century American politicians
Businesspeople from Columbia, Missouri
People from St. Croix Falls, Wisconsin